An authoritarian leadership style is descried as being as "leaders behavior that asserts absolute authority and control over subordinates and [that] demands unquestionable obedience from subordinates." Such a leader has full control of the team, leaving low autonomy within the group. The group is expected to complete the tasks under very close supervision, while unlimited authority is self-bestowed by the leader. Subordinates' responses to the orders given are either punished or rewarded. A way that those that have authoritarian leadership behaviors tend to lean more on "...unilateral decision-making through the leader and strive to maintain the distance between the leader and his or her followers."

Background
Authoritarian leaders are commonly referred to as "autocratic" leaders. They sometimes, but not always, provide clear expectations for what needs to be done, when it should be done, and how it should be done. There is also a clear divide between the leader and the followers. Bob Altemeyer conducted research on what he labeled right-wing authoritarianism (RWA), and presented an analysis of the personality types of both the authoritarian leaders and the authoritarian followers.

Authoritarian leaders make decisions independently with little or no input from the rest of the group. They uphold stringent control over their followers by directly regulating rules, methodologies, and actions. Authoritarian leaders construct gaps and build distance between themselves and their followers with the intention of stressing role distinctions. This type of leadership dates back to the earliest tribes and empires. It is often used in present-day when there is little room for error, such as construction jobs or manufacturing jobs.

Authoritarian leadership typically fosters little creativity in decision-making. Lewin also found that it is more difficult to move from an authoritarian style to a democratic style than vice versa. Abuse of this style is usually viewed as controlling, bossy and dictatorial. Authoritarian leadership is best applied to situations where there is little time for group discussion.

Views of authoritarian leaders
A common belief of many authoritarian leaders is that followers require direct supervision at all times, or else they would not operate effectively. This belief is in accordance with one of Douglas McGregor's philosophical views of humankind, Theory X. This concept proposes that it is a leader's role to coerce and control followers because people have an inherent aversion to work and will abstain from it whenever possible. Theory X also postulates that people must be compelled through force, intimidation, or authority, and controlled, directed, or threatened with punishment in order to get them to accomplish the organizational needs.

In the minds of authoritarian leaders, people who are left to work autonomously will ultimately be unproductive. “Examples of authoritarian communicative behavior include a police officer directing traffic, a teacher ordering a student to do his or her assignment, and a supervisor instructing a subordinate to clean a workstation.”  However, studies do show that having some form of authoritarian leader around can produce some improvement through any field of work, and daily tasks with those of authoritarian styles of leadership. In an article titled, "How Authoritarian Leadership Affects Employee's Helping Behavior? The Mediating Role of Rumination and Moderating Role of Psychological Ownership," states that, "Psychological ownership, positively associated with citizenship behaviors, job satisfaction and commitment, and negatively related to deviant work behaviors, could be used as a boundary condition for the relationship between authoritarian leadership and rumination, and can buffer the adverse effects of authoritarian leadership on rumination and weakens their positive relationship."

Communication patterns 

Downward, one-way communication (i.e. leaders to followers, or supervisors to subordinates)
Controls discussion with followers
Dominates interaction
Independently/unilaterally sets policy and procedures
Individually directs the completion of tasks
Does not offer constant feedback
Rewards acquiescent obedient behavior and punishes erroneous actions
Poor listener
Uses conflict for individual gain

Ways to properly incorporate authoritarian leadership 

Always explain rules: it allows your subordinates to complete the task you want to be done efficiently.
Be consistent: if you are to enforce rules and regulations, make sure to do so regularly so your subordinates take you seriously. This will form a stronger level of trust.
Respect your subordinates: always recognize your subordinates' efforts and achievements.
Educate your subordinates by enforcing rules: do not present them with any surprises. This can lead to problems in the future due to false communication.
Listen to suggestions from your subordinates, even if you do not incorporate them.

Effects of authoritarian leadership communication styles 

Increase in productivity when the leader is present 
Produces more accurate solutions when the leader is knowledgeable 
Is more positively accepted in larger groups 
Enhances performance on simple tasks and decreases performance on complex tasks 
Increases aggression levels among followers 
Increases turnover rates 
Successful when there is a time urgency for completion of projects
Improves the future work of those subordinates whose skills are not very applicable or helpful without the demands of another

Downfalls 

 Long-term use can cause resentment from subordinates. 
It has been found by researchers that these types of leaders lack creative problem solving skills
Without proper instruction and understanding from subordinates, confusion may arise

Examples of authoritarian leaders

Engelbert Dollfuss, chancellor of Austria from 1932 to 1934, destroyed the Austrian Republic and established an authoritarian regime based on conservative Roman Catholic and Italian Fascist principles. In May 1932 when he became chancellor, Dollfuss headed a conservative coalition led by the Christian Social Party. When faced with a severe economic crisis caused by the Great Depression, Dollfuss decided against joining Germany in a customs union, a course advocated by many Austrians. Severely criticized by Social Democrats, Pan-German nationalists, and Austrian Nazis, he countered by drifting toward an increasingly authoritarian regime.

The Italian leader Benito Mussolini became Dollfuss' principal foreign ally. Italy guaranteed Austrian independence at Riccione (August 1933), but in return Austria had to abolish all political parties and reform its constitution on the Fascist model. In March 1933, Dollfuss’ attacks on Parliament culminated that September in the permanent abolition of the legislature and the formation of a corporate state based on his Vaterländische Front (“Fatherland Front”); with which he expected to replace Austria’s political parties. In foreign affairs, he steered a course that converted Austria virtually into an Italian satellite state. Hoping therewith to prevent Austria’s incorporation into Nazi Germany, he fought his domestic political opponents along fascist-authoritarian lines.

In February 1934 paramilitary formations loyal to the chancellor crushed Austria’s Social Democrats. With a new constitution of May 1934, his regime became completely dictatorial. In June, however, Germany incited the Austrian Nazis to civil war. Dollfuss was assassinated by the Nazis in a raid on the chancellery.

One must be careful drawing similarities between political dictators and the authoritarian styles of non-politicians.  For example, one might argue - controversially - that Martha Stewart had an authoritarian style.  She constructed her empire through her own special attention to every detail.  She was meticulous, demanding, thorough, and diligent. She flourished in her ventures and in using her authoritarian leadership style.

The autocratic leadership style works well if the leader is competent and knowledgeable enough to decide about each and every item under their control. Authoritative leadership is considered one of the most effective leadership styles in the event of an emergency where quick decisions need to be taken. Bill Gates adopted this style and has steered Microsoft toward great success. According to Bill Gates, he had a vision when he took reins of the company and then used all the resources available to make that vision a reality. In the personal computer workplace, many operating conditions call for urgent action, making this style of leadership effective. While Gates does not exhibit this style consistently, his success can be judged by his decision-making process and the growth of the computer industry in the world.

References

Leadership studies
Authoritarianism
Workplace bullying
Coercion